Michael David Stromberg (born May 25, 1945) is a former American football linebacker in the National Football League (NFL) who played for the New York Jets. He played college football at Temple University.

References 

Living people
Temple Owls football players
1945 births
American football linebackers
New York Jets players